Real Man is the sixth studio album by American country music singer Billy Dean. It was released August 25, 1998, via Capitol Records Nashville. The album includes two singles: the title track and "Innocent Bystander", which respectively reached #33 and #68 on the U.S. Billboard country singles charts. Dean co-produced the album with David Gates, formerly of Bread, and co-wrote several of its songs with him. "Voices Singing," features the St. Nicholas School Children's Choir of Chattanooga, as well as Dean's son, Eli.

Track listing

Personnel

 Barry Bales – bass guitar
 Eddie Bayers – drums
 Ron Block – banjo
 Sam Bush – fiddle
 Billy Dean – acoustic guitar, electric guitar, mandolin, percussion, lead vocals, background vocals
 Jerry Douglas – dobro
 Dave Dunseath – drums
 Paul Franklin – steel guitar
 David Gates – bass guitar, keyboards, string arrangements, background vocals
 Doc Hollister – piano
 Gina Jeffreys – duet vocals on "If I Could Find the Heart (To Love Again)"
 Kenny Lewis – bass guitar
 Renee Martin – background vocals
 Brent Mason – electric guitar
 Terry McMillan – percussion
 Andy Most – electric guitar
 Steve Nathan – keyboards
 David Pack – background vocals
 Matt Rollings – piano
 John Wesley Ryles – background vocals
 St. Nicholas School Children's Choir – choir
 Steuart Smith – electric guitar
 Dan Tyminski – mandolin
 Glenn Worf – bass guitar
 Curtis Young – background vocals

Chart performance

References
Allmusic

1998 albums
Capitol Records albums
Billy Dean albums